Dutschke is a surname. Notable people with the surname include:

 Everett Dutschke (born 1971/72), American 2nd suspect arrested in 2013 ricin-letters case
 Rudi Dutschke (1940–1979), German sociologist and political activist